Chłopice  (Khlopychi) is a village in Jarosław County, Subcarpathian Voivodeship, in south-eastern Poland. It is the seat of the gmina (administrative district) called Gmina Chłopice.

References

Villages in Jarosław County